There are several types of Croatian bagpipes, they are:

Slavonske gajde - a bagpipe with double chanter and a single drone
Duda - a bagpipe with triple/quadruple chanter and a single drone. Two versions exist, one from Podravina and one from Bilogora
Istarski mih - a bagpipe with double chanter and no drone
Dalmatinski mih - Diple - a bagpipe with double chanter and no drone
Hercegovački mih - a bagpipe with double chanter and no drone
Mih s Pelješca - a bagpipe with double chanter and no drone
Surle - a bagpipe with double chanter and no drone

References

Bagpipes
Croatian musical instruments
Bagpipes by country